Jackie Judd is a health media journalist.

Life
Judd attended Woodlawn High School in Baltimore County, Maryland and received a bachelor of arts degree from American University in 1974. She began her career in radio, eventually working for National Public Radio and CBS News Radio before becoming a television journalist. 

From 1987 to 2003 Judd worked in the Washington bureau of ABC News. She left on-camera journalism to join the staff of the Kaiser Family Foundation in 2003.

References

External links
Judd speaks on a panel about the history of television news reporting
Judd interviews a politician on health issues
Judd interviews an HIV researcher

American medical journalists
American University alumni
Living people
Year of birth missing (living people)